The 2012 Gardner–Webb Runnin' Bulldogs football team represented Gardner–Webb University in the 2012 NCAA Division I FCS football season. They were led by second-year head coach Ron Dickerson, Jr. and played their home games at Ernest W. Spangler Stadium. They are a member of the Big South Conference. They finished the season 3–8, 2–4 in Big South play to finish in fifth place.

Schedule

Source: Schedule

References

Gardner-Webb
Gardner–Webb Runnin' Bulldogs football seasons
Gardner